Brittany Pozzi Tonozzi (born February 9, 1984) is an American professional rodeo cowgirl who specializes in barrel racing. She is a two-time Women’s Professional Rodeo Association (WPRA) Barrel Racing World Champion. In December 2007 and 2009, she won the championship at the National Finals Rodeo (NFR) in Las Vegas, Nevada.

Life
Brittany Pozzi Tonozzi was born Brittany Pozzi on February 9, 1984, in Victoria, Texas. She recently moved to Lampasas, Texas, in April 2019. She attended Texas A&M University (College Station). She is married to Garrett Tonozzi. They have one daughter. She learned barrel racing from her father.

Career
Tonozzi joined the Women's Professional Rodeo Association in 2003. Tonozzi won the World Barrel Racing Championship at the NFR in 2007 and 2009. She won the NFR Average title twice, in 2006 and 2007. She has qualified for the NFR 14 times in 2003, 2005, 2006, 2007, 2008, 2009, 2010, 2011, 2012, 2013, 2017, 2018, 2019, and 2020. She also qualified for the Ram National Circuit Finals Rodeo twice in 2012 and 2013. Tonozzi's earnings in 2019 were $105,503. She came in 5th in the World Standings. Her career earnings to date as of 2019 are $2,321,480. CNBC recognized Tonozzi as one of their "Blue Collar Millionaires", for her hard work in breeding and training horses as well as barrel racing.

2019 highlights
Tonozzi won the Rio Grande Valley Livestock Show and Rodeo in Mercedes, Texas. She won the Evergreen Rodeo in Colorado. She was the co-winner of the Elizabeth Stampede in Colorado. She won the Kit Carson County Pro Rodeo in Burlington, Colorado. She won the Canby Rodeo in Oregon. She qualified for the NFR.

2020 highlights

On Friday, February 7, Tonozzi won her fourth title at the San Angelo Stock Show and Rodeo in San Angelo, Texas. She ran a time of 13.93 in the finals, and it was the fastest time of the rodeo. She won $3,270 for the finals along with her $6,622 for winning the average with three runs for a total time of 44.15. At the finals at the end of February, Tonozzi won the title at the San Antonio Stock Show and Rodeo in San Antonio, Texas.

Tonozzi also finished second at these rodeos: Yuma Fair & Rodeo in Colorado, Oakley Independence Day Rodeo in Utah, Coleman PRCA Rodeo in Texas, and West Texas Fair & Rodeo in Abilene, Texas.

Horses
She has a horse with the registered name KissKiss BangBang, nicknamed "Mona", who is a 11-year-old mare as of 2021. Mona is by Dash Ta Fame out of CD Nick Bar. She has another horse with the registered name Babe on the Chase, nicknamed "Birdie", who is a 10-year-old mare as of 2021. Birdie is by Chasin Firewater and out of Streakin Six Babe.

She has another horse registered name Ima Famous Babe, nicknamed "Katniss", who is an 8-year-old mare as of 2021. Katniss is by Dash Ta Fame and out of Streakin Six Babe. Ima Famous Babe won the 2019 Scoti Flit Bar Award.

She has another horse registered named Steele Magnolias, nicknamed "Steeley", who is by Magnolia Bar out of Kings Frosted Lady. Her horse registered name Sixth Vision, nicknamed "Stitch", won the AQHA/WPRA Barrel Racing Horse of the Year Award in 2007, and came in second in 2006. Her horse registered name Yeah Hes Firen, nicknamed "Duke", tied for the award in 2011 and won it in 2012.

References

Bibliography

External links 
 Women's Professional Rodeo Association
 Professional Rodeo Cowboys Association
 National Finals Rodeo

1984 births
Living people
American barrel racers
People from Victoria, Texas
People from Lampasas, Texas
American female equestrians
21st-century American women